Radical 98 or radical tile meaning "tile" is one of the 23 Kangxi radicals (214 radicals in total) composed of 5 strokes.

In the Kangxi Dictionary there are 174 characters (out of 49,030) to be found under this radical.

 is also the 72nd indexing component in the Table of Indexing Chinese Character Components predominantly adopted by Simplified Chinese dictionaries published in mainland China. The radical was modified in xin zixing and consists of only 4 strokes as opposed to the 5-stroke traditional form.

Evolution

Derived characters

Literature

External links

Unihan Database - U+74E6

098
072